Chelonychus is a genus of true weevils in the beetle family Curculionidae. There are at least two described species in Chelonychus.

Species
These two species belong to the genus Chelonychus:
 Chelonychus longipes Dietz, 1891 i c b
 Chelonychus stragulus Clark & Burke, 2002 c
Data sources: i = ITIS, c = Catalogue of Life, g = GBIF, b = Bugguide.net

References

Further reading

 
 
 
 

Curculioninae
Articles created by Qbugbot